The Appellate Court of Maryland is the intermediate appellate court for the U.S. state of Maryland. The Appellate Court of Maryland was created in 1966 in response to the rapidly growing caseload in the Supreme Court of Maryland.  Like the state's highest court, the tribunal meets in the Robert C. Murphy Courts of Appeal Building in the state capital, Annapolis.

The Appellate Court of Maryland originally could hear only criminal cases. However, its jurisdiction has expanded so that it now considers any reviewable judgment, decree, order, or other action of the circuit and orphans’ courts, unless otherwise provided by law. Judges sitting on the Appellate Court of Maryland generally hear and decide cases in panels of three. In some instances, however, all 15 judges may listen to a case, known as an en banc hearing.

A ballot proposal in the 2022 general election asked Maryland voters whether to change the court's name from the Maryland Court of Special Appeals to the Appellate Court of Maryland. The measure was approved by 74.2% of voters on November 8, 2022. It changed to this name on December 14, 2022.

Judges

Appointment and qualifications

The fifteen judges of the Appellate Court of Maryland are appointed by the Governor of Maryland with Senate consent. They serve ten-year terms.

The Judges of the court are required to be citizens of and qualified voters in Maryland.  Prior to their appointment, they must have resided in Maryland for at least five years, and for at least six months in the appellate judicial circuit from which they are appointed. They must be at least thirty years of age at the time of appointment, and must have been admitted to practice law in Maryland. Appointees should be "most distinguished for integrity, wisdom and sound legal knowledge."

After initial appointment by the Governor and confirmation by the Senate, members of the court, at the first general election occurring at least one year after their appointment, run for continuance in office on their records without opposition. If the voters reject the retention in office of a judge, or the vote is tied, the office becomes vacant. Otherwise, the incumbent judge is retained in office for a ten-year term. This requirement of voter approval is similar to provisions of the Missouri Plan, a non-partisan method for selecting judges which is used by 11 states.

There are eight at large judges and one judge from each of the state's seven Judicial Circuits; the latter are required to be a resident of his or her respective circuit.  The circuits are currently as follows:

Current judges

The current judges on the court are:

 Chief Judge E. Gregory Wells, At Large
 Judge Christopher B. Kehoe, 1st Appellate Circuit
 Judge Douglas R. M. Nazarian, 2nd Appellate Circuit
 Judge Kathryn Grill Graeff, 3rd Appellate Circuit
 Judge Melanie Marva Shaw Geter, 4th Appellate Circuit
 Judge Laura S. Ripken, 5th Appellate Circuit
 Judge Michael W. Reed, 6th Appellate Circuit
 Judge Rosalyn Tang, 7th Appellate Circuit
 Judge Kevin F. Arthur, At Large
 Judge Donald E. Beachley, At Large
 Judge Stuart R. Berger, At Large
 Judge Dan Friedman, At Large
 Judge Andrea M. Leahy, At Large
 Judge Terrence M. R. Zic, At Large
 Judge Anne K. Albright, At Large

See also
Courts of Maryland

References

External links
Homepage for the Appellate Court of Maryland
Maryland Judiciary homepage

Maryland state courts
State appellate courts of the United States
1966 establishments in Maryland
Courts and tribunals established in 1966